Max Mok (born 2 December 1962 in Hong Kong; also credited as Benny Mok, Benny Mok Siu-chung and Max Mok Siu-chung) is a Hong Kong actor and singer. Mok was recruited by the Shaw Brothers Studio and has been a major film star since the 1980s. Mok is perhaps best known as Leung Foon in Once Upon a Time in China II, III, IV and V, after replacing Yuen Biao who was in the first film. In the Philippines, he is known as Bronson Lee.

History and early career

Acting
In 1980s, Mok played an Interpol Agent in 1986 film Magic Crystal along with Andy Lau, Cynthia Rothrock and Richard Norton. Mok played second member of Col Young's commando in 1987 film Eastern Condors, alongside Sammo Hung, Yuen Biao, Joyce Godenzi, Yuen Wah, Billy Chow, Corey Yuen and Yuen Woo-ping.

In 1990s, Mok replaced Yuen Biao, when Yuen declined to reprise his role after the first film was finished. Mok played Leung Foon in four Once Upon a Time in China movies they were: Once Upon a Time in China II, III, IV and V alongside Jet Li, Rosamund Kwan and Vincent Zhao. After Once Upon a Time in China V, Mok didn't appear in the sixth sequel and nobody will replacing him.

In 2000s, Mok played Suk Gwat in the 2004 film Love Is a Many Stupid Thing alongside Shawn Yue Man-lok. Mok played Big Eyes in 2008 film Run Papa Run alongside Louis Koo and Nora Miao.

Filmography

Film

Usurpers of Emperor's Power (1983) ... Prince De Zhao
The Lady Assassin (1983) ... 14th Prince
The Enchantress (1983) ... Feng Xiwu
Holy Flame of the Martial World (1983) ... Yin Tien Chu
Thunderclap (1984)
My Mind, Your Body (1985)
Journey of the Doomed (1985) ... Swallow 13
Magic Crystal (1986) ... Interpol agent
Eastern Condors (1987) ... Soldier sitting in staging area
Hero of Tomorrow (1988) ... Crow Yeung Tin Shin
The Dragon Family (1988) ... Chung
Three Wishes (1988) ... Sing
Lai Shi, China's Last Eunuch (1988) ... Liu Lai-Shi
Faithfully Yours (1988) ... Big Eye/Ki Ho-Yan
Blood Call (1988)
Close Escape (1989) ... Lam Wai Leung
Long Arm of the Law Part 3 (1989) ... Chicken Heart
Path of Glory (1989) ... Stanley Tang
Hearts No Flowers (1989) ... Paul Poon On Dah
Pedicab Driver (1989) ... Malted Candy
Seven Warriors (1989) ... Yung
Little Cop (1989) ... Mei Yen Xin
City Kids 1989 (1989) ... Chow Chor-San
Lucky Star (1989)
Ghost Fever (1989) ... Hui Zen
Lung Fung Restaurant (1990) ... Lung Ching
The Outlaw Brothers (1990) ... Bond
That's Money (1990)
Never Say Regret (1990) ... Jimmy
The Fortune Code (1990) ... Little Candy
Whampoa Blues (1990) ... Luo Ying Cong
An Eye for an Eye (1990) ... Chung
Family Honor (1990) ... Chung
No Way Back (1990)
Son on the Run (1991) ... Hung Long 	
Off Track (1991) ... Joe 	
Mission of Condor (1991) ... Chow Man - Stephen 	
Sisters in Law (1992) ... Tsui Tung 	
Night Life Hero (1992) ... Chung 	
Once Upon a Time in China II (1992) ... Leung Foon 	
Summer Lover (1992) ... Chung 	
The Twilight of the Forbidden City (1992) ... Loy Hay / Eunuch Chun Lu 	
Secret Signs (1993) ... Yung Wing Kam 	
Slave of the Sword (1993) ... Eunuch Li 	
Once Upon a Time in China III (1993) ... Leung Foon 	
Once Upon a Time in China IV (1993) ... Leung Foon 	
Angel of the Road (1993) 	  	 
The Assassin (1993) ... Wang Kou 	
No Regret, No Return (1993) ... Victor 	
Fait Accompli (1994) ... Wong Chun-Wai 	
Lantern (1994) 	  	 
Once Upon a Time in China V (1994) ... Leung Foon 	
Gambling Baron (1994) ... Chen Chun 	
How Deep Is Your Love (1994) ... Joe 	
Fire Dragon (1994) ... Yuen Ming 	
Heart of Killer (1995) ... Gung Gwan 	
Dangerous Duty (1996) ... Chung 	
Top Borrower (1997) 	  	 
Happy Together (1997) ... Chow Lik Ping 	
Nightmare Zone (1998) ... Simon Chu/Ho Sun [2 Roles] 	
The Doctor in Spite of Himself (1999) ... Secret Officer Pak Yeung 	
The Golden Nightmare (1999) ... Prof. Li Kuo Wan 	
One Drop of Blood Per Step (2000) 	  	 
D7 SDU (2000) 	  	 
Romancing Bullet (2000) ... AK 	
Forever Love (2001) 	  	 
Revenge (2002) ... Ah Jun 	
Crazy Guy (2002) 	  	 
No Place to Go (2003) 	  	 
Star Runner (2003) ... Bullshit Bill 	
Resistless Mission (2004) 	  	 
Cho Tai Yan Yuan (2004) 	  	 
Love Is a Many Stupid Thing (2004) ... Ghost 	
In the Blue (2006) 	  	 
Si Da Jin Chai (2007) 	  	 
Run Papa Run (2008) ... Big Eyes 	
Super Player (2010) ... Martial arts hero 	
Just Try Me (2012) ... Doctor 	
7 Assassins (2012) ... Chen Mu Bai 	
Fox Fairy (2012) 	  	 
Careful Man Without a Shadow (2013) 	  	 
Desperado (2014) 	  	 
The Gift of the Life (2014) 	  	 
The Apparition (2016)

TV series
Princess Chang Ping (1980) ATV
Dynasty (1980)
Operation Nuwa (1981)
Ode to Gallantry (1985)
Wong Fei Hung Series (1995)

Discography

Albums

Awards

Personal life
Mok was arrested in Beijing on Friday, 15 April 2011, for alleged drug abuse.

See also
Tsui Hark-Hong Kong Director
Once Upon a Time in China about legendary Chinese folk hero, Wong Fei Hung-Hong Kong action film written and directed by Tsui Hark

References

External links
hkcinemagic-Biography
lovehkfilm-filmography
Max Siu-Chung 
Album-by Max Mok from HMV

1962 births
Living people
Hong Kong male actors
Hong Kong male singers
Cantopop singers
Hong Kong Buddhists